Cinnamomum iners is a tree species in the family Lauraceae described by Reinwardt and Blume. No subspecies are listed in the Catalogue of Life.  It occurs naturally in Myanmar, Thailand, Laos, Cambodia, Vietnam, Malaysia, Indonesia, Brunei, Singapore, the Philippines and southern China.

In Malay C. iners is called pokok medang teja; in Vietnamese it may be called: quế rừng, quế giả, quế lá to, quế lợn, hậu phác, or hậu phác nam.

Description 
Cinnamomum iners is an evergreen tree growing up to 20 m in height; the branches have opposite twigs, robust and angular, sometimes tetragonal, glabrescent. 
Leaves are subopposed, ovate to elliptic, measuring 120–350 mm long and 60–85 mm broad. They are glabrous and the base of the leaf is wedge-shaped with a blunt apex (see illustrations); petioles are more or less pubescent, have a reddish brown colour and 10–30 mm in length. 
Flowers small and bisexual, pubescent, grouped in axillary or terminal panicles; these inflorescences are 60–260 mm in length.  Fruits are ovoid in shape, typically 10 mm long and 7 mm in width.
This species grows in moist woods and thickets, at altitudes up to 1000 m; trees bloom and start to bear fruit from March to June.

Gallery

References

External links 

iners
Flora of China
Flora of Indo-China
Flora of Malesia
Indomalayan realm flora